Thomas J. Hylton, (Tom Hylton, Thomas Hylton) a Pulitzer Prize-winning journalist from Pottstown, Pennsylvania, is the author of a book called Save Our Land, Save Our Towns and host of a public television documentary, .

Born in Wyomissing, Pennsylvania, in 1948, Hylton graduated from Kutztown University in 1970
and began working as a staff writer for The Mercury in Pottstown the following year.  He won a Pulitzer Prize in 1990 for Mercury editorials about a bond issue for the preservation of farmland and open space.  He resigned from the newspaper in 1994 to write his book and organize a non-profit dedicated to land use planning and community building in Pennsylvania.

Hylton's book Save Our Land, Save Our Towns: A Plan for Pennsylvania was published in 1995 by RB Books and illustrated with photography by Blair Seitz. It won the National Trust for Historic Preservation award.

References

External links
 http://www.pulitzer.org/bycat/Editorial-Writing
 Sunday Book Review, Philadelphia Inquirer, Dec. 17, 1995.  
 Television documentary review, Pittsburgh Post Gazette, June 17, 2000
 http://www.saveourlandsaveourtowns.org
 The book: https://www.amazon.com/Save-Our-Land-Towns-Pennsylvania/dp/1879441446
 The video: http://www.bullfrogfilms.com/catalog/save.html

1948 births
Living people
Writers from Pennsylvania
Kutztown University of Pennsylvania alumni
Pulitzer Prize for Editorial Writing winners